Simon Brook, Brooke or Broke may refer to:

Film and TV
Simon Brook (actor) in Twisted (1996 film)
Simon Brook (director), British director, son of Peter Brook
Simon Brooke (actor) in Into the Woods (Desperate Housewives)

Others
Simon Broke, MP for Gloucester
Simon Brooke (rugby), player for Alcobendas Rugby
Simon Brook (died 1968), Australian child possibly murdered by Derek Percy

See also
Simon Brooks (disambiguation)